The McFIT GmbH  is the largest fitness centre chain in Germany with 246 studios and over 1.4 million members in Germany, Austria, Italy, Poland and Spain. The company's headquarters is in Schlüsselfeld. Directed by founder Rainer Schaller, the company generated about €160 million in total revenue in 2010.

The company's logo is a rolling ribbon with "McFIT" written on it and the slogan "Einfach gut aussehen", which roughly translates to "Simply looking good". The company developed a training concept of their own together with sports scientists based on weight and exercise combined with healthy nutrition.

The chain follows a no-frills policy: Membership costs €24.90 per month. It includes access to every area, as well as the shower fee. Most clubs in Germany, Italy, Austria, Spain and Poland are open 24 hours a day, 365 days a year. Members are allowed to bring their drinks. Until February 2011, McFit offered a free magazine, but it doesn't offer additional services like a wellness area or courses (e.g. Aerobics).

From 2006 to 2010, McFIT was the main sponsor of the Love Parade, and Rainer Schaller became the sole owner of its organizing company Lopavent GmbH when the original organizers left the company. After a stampede that left 21 people dead and hundreds injured, Schaller announced there would be no more Love Parades. Schaller was killed in a plane crash in Costa Rica in 2022.

McFIT also runs McFIT Models, a sports model agency that declares itself as the largest sports model agency in Europe. The successful German fashion designer Michael Michalsky supports the agency as an art director.

In 2015 McFIT started planning the establishment of low-budget fitness centres, especially for smaller towns. About 30 of these fitness centres with monthly membership costs of less than €10 will open within 2015.

In 2018 McFIT now also has a premium brand called "John Reed".

There are 257 gyms as of 2019 in the following countries:

References

External links
Official website of McFIT
Official website of McFIT Models

Health clubs
Medical and health organisations based in Bavaria